Bryant Vincent (born October 18, 1975) is an American football coach who is currently the offensive coordinator at the University of New Mexico. Vincent was elevated to interim head coach at UAB in June 2022 after Bill Clark announced his retirement.

Coaching career

High school
Vincent was initially a member of the baseball program at West Alabama before joining the football program as a student assistant in 1996. After graduating from West Alabama, he worked as an elementary school teacher and assistant football coach in Hart County, Kentucky before returning to Alabama the next year.

Vincent was an assistant coach at Charles Henderson High School and Spain Park High School in Alabama before being named the head coach at Greenville High School in 2006. Greenville went 10–3 in Vincent's lone season at the helm, and Vincent won the Class 5A Coach of the Year Award. Vincent was also the head coach at Spanish Fort High School from 2007 to 2010, where he accumulated a record of 39–13.

South Alabama
Vincent was hired to be the tight ends coach at South Alabama in 2011. He was reassigned to quarterbacks coach in 2012.

UAB
Vincent was hired as the offensive coordinator at UAB in 2014. The football program was shut down after the season.

South Alabama (second stint)
Vincent was hired back at South Alabama in 2015 as their assistant head coach, co-offensive coordinator, and quarterbacks coach. He was fired by South Alabama in September 2017.

UAB (second stint)
Vincent was hired as the offensive coordinator and quarterbacks coach at UAB in 2018.

New Mexico 
Vincent was named the offensive coordinator at New Mexico on Jan. 3, 2023.

Head coaching record

College

References

External links
 
 UAB profile

1975 births
Living people
South Alabama Jaguars football coaches
UAB Blazers football coaches
West Alabama Tigers football coaches
High school football coaches in Alabama
High school football coaches in Kentucky
University of West Alabama alumni
People from Glasgow, Kentucky
Coaches of American football from Kentucky